Cranberry Township is one of the sixteen townships of Crawford County, Ohio, United States. As of the 2010 census there were 1,579 people living in the township, 612 of whom were in the unincorporated portions.

Geography
Located in the northeastern part of the county, it borders the following townships:
Richmond Township, Huron County - northeast
Auburn Township - east
Vernon Township - southeast corner
Sandusky Township - south
Liberty Township - southwest
Chatfield Township - west
Venice Township, Seneca County - northwest

The village of New Washington is located in northwestern Cranberry Township.

Name and history
Cranberry Township was founded in the 1820s. It was named from a cranberry marsh in the southwestern part.

It is the only Cranberry Township statewide.

Government
The township is governed by a three-member board of trustees, who are elected in November of odd-numbered years to a four-year term beginning on the following January 1. Two are elected in the year after the presidential election and one is elected in the year before it. There is also an elected township fiscal officer, who serves a four-year term beginning on April 1 of the year after the election, which is held in November of the year before the presidential election. Vacancies in the fiscal officership or on the board of trustees are filled by the remaining trustees.

References

External links
County website

Townships in Crawford County, Ohio
Townships in Ohio